Where Have I Known You Before is the fourth album by the band Return to Forever and the second since leader Chick Corea changed the line-up and moved to electric instrumentation, playing jazz fusion influenced by progressive rock.

Background, instrumentation, compositions 
Although Return to Forever's style remained unchanged since its previous album, Hymn of the Seventh Galaxy (1973), important changes took place in the band's sound and line-up. Chick Corea started to use synthesizers, such as the Minimoog and ARP Odyssey. An equally important change was the replacement of guitarist Bill Connors with 19-year-old Al Di Meola. Connors left the band before the recording of this album to concentrate on his acoustic solo career. Another reason for his departure was his reluctance to travel; he preferred to stay in the San Francisco area. Also, Bill was not happy with Chick pushing certain aspects of Scientology on him.

Between the album's longer tracks are three of Corea's short piano improvisations that all bore a title beginning with "Where Have I...".

The first track is Stanley Clarke's "Vulcan Worlds" with melodic motifs that appear on Clarke's second solo album Stanley Clarke during the same year 1974. The song shows Clarke is "one of the fastest and most facile electric bassists around". Each player except for drummer Lenny White took long solos.

The next long track is Lenny White's composition "The Shadow of Lo", a piece with many changes in mood. The last track on Side A is Corea's "Beyond the Seventh Galaxy", a sequel to his "Hymn of the Seventh Galaxy", the title track from the group's previous album. Side B begins with the collective jam "Earth Juice". Most of Side B was is taken up by Corea's 14-minute epic "Song to the Pharaoh Kings", a song notable for its use of the harmonic minor scale. The track has a long keyboard introduction, after which Chick Corea is joined by the full band, and an "Eastern" theme appears. Each member of the band plays a long solo.

Track listing

Personnel
Musicians
 Chick Corea – acoustic piano,  Fender Rhodes electric piano, Hohner clavinet, Yamaha electric organ, synthesizers (ARP Odyssey, Minimoog), percussion
 Al Di Meola – electric guitar, acoustic twelve-string guitar
 Stanley Clarke – electric bass guitar, Yamaha electric organ, bell tree, chimes
 Lenny White – drums, congas, bongos, percussion

Technical personnel
 Shelly Yakus – engineer
 Tom Rabstenek – mastering
 Herb Dreiwitz – front cover photography

Chart performance

References

External links 
 Return to Forever - Where Have I Known You Before (1974) album review by Scott Yanow, credits & releases at AllMusic
 Return to Forever - Where Have I Known You Before (1974) album releases & credits at Discogs
 Return to Forever - Where Have I Known You Before (1974) album credits & user reviews at ProgArchives.com
 Return to Forever - Where Have I Known You Before (1974) album to be listened as stream on Spotify

Polydor Records albums
Return to Forever albums
1974 albums